Allegra may refer to:

People
 Allegra (given name), people with the given name Allegra
 Antonio Allegra (1905–1969), Italian organist and lyricist
 Chad Allegra (born 1980), American professional wrestler better known as Karl Anderson
 Francis Allegra (1957–2015), judge of the U.S. Court of Federal Claims
 Gabriele Allegra (1907–1976), beatified Italian Catholic priest
 Indira Allegra, multidisciplinary American artist and writer 
 Salvatore Allegra (1898–1993), Italian composer

Railway
 Rhaetian Railway ABe 8/12, a powerful three-car electric multiple-unit train on Swiss meter gauge
 The brand name for the Hakone Tozan 3000 series trains in Japan

Drugs
 Fexofenadine, an antihistamine drug sold under the brand names Allegra, Allerfexo, Telfast, and others

Other
 Allegra, 1999 live album by Fifteen
 Opel Allegra, a car
 Allegra, a greeting in the Romansh language of south-eastern Switzerland
 Allegra (genus), a genus of protists belonging to the group Placidozoa

See also
 Allegro (disambiguation)